"Days of Our Livez" is a single by Bone Thugs-n-Harmony. The instrumental is primarily based on  samples  of "Tender Love" by Force MDs and "Making Love in the Rain" by Herb Alpert. It was released on the soundtrack to the movie Set It Off and is played in the film. The song also appears on the group's 1998 compilation album The Collection Volume One and Bone's greatest hits album. The song was a commercial success, peaking at #20 on the Billboard Hot 100,#10 on the R&B/Hip Hop Singles and Tracks, It also reached number 37 on the UK Singles Chart, and was later certified Gold by the RIAA. It is also considered by many fans to be an underrated classic and one of Bone's greatest hits with its slow, melodic tone similar to that of "Tha Crossroads".

Charts

Year-end charts

References 

1996 singles
Bone Thugs-n-Harmony songs
Songs written by Jimmy Jam and Terry Lewis
1996 songs
Ruthless Records singles
Songs written by Bizzy Bone
Songs written by Krayzie Bone
Songs written by Flesh-n-Bone
Songs written by Wish Bone
Songs written by DJ U-Neek